Marshmallows is the debut mini-LP of The For Carnation, released on March 12, 1996 by Matador Records.

Track listing

Personnel 
Adapted from the Marshmallows liner notes.

The For Carnation
 John Herndon – drums
 Doug McCombs – bass guitar
 Brian McMahan – vocals, guitar
 Michael McMahan – guitar
 John Weiss – drums

Production and additional personnel
 Grant Barger – engineering
 Greg Calbi – mastering
 Gordon Jenkins and his Orchestra – arrangement, strings
 Elizabeth Kelly – painting
 Andy Vandette – mastering
 Brad Wood – engineering

Release history

References

External links 
 

1996 debut albums
The For Carnation albums
Matador Records albums